

Portugal
 Angola – 
 Vasco Guedes de Carvalho e Meneses, Governor-General of Angola (1878–1880)
 António Eleutério Dantas, Governor-General of Angola (1880–1882)

United Kingdom
 Jamaica – Sir Anthony Musgrave, Governor of Jamaica (1877–1883)
 Malta Colony – Arthur Borton, Governor of Malta (1878–1884)
 New South Wales – Lord Augustus Loftus, Governor of New South Wales (1879–1885)
 Queensland – Sir Arthur Kennedy, Governor of Queensland (1877–1883)
 Tasmania – Major Frederick Weld, Governor of Tasmania (1875–1880)
 South Australia – Lieutenant-General William Jervois, Governor of South Australia (1877–1883)
 Victoria – George Phipps, Lord Normanby, Governor of Victoria (1879–1884)
 Western Australia 
 Major-General Harry Ord, Governor of Western Australia (1877–1880)
 Sir William Robinson, Governor of Western Australia (1880–1883)

Colonial governors
Colonial governors
1880